Kepler-35 is a binary star system in the constellation of Cygnus. These stars, called Kepler-35A and Kepler-35B have masses of 89% and 81% solar masses respectively, and both are assumed to be of spectral class G. They are separated by 0.176 AU, and complete an eccentric orbit around a common center of mass every 20.73 days.

Description
The Kepler-35 system consists of two stars slightly less massive than the sun in a 21-day orbit aligned edge-on to us so that the stars eclipse each other.  The orbit has a semi-major axis  and a mild eccentricity of 0.16.  of The precise measurements made by the Kepler satellite allow doppler beaming to be detected, as well as brightness variations due to the ellipsoidal shape of the stars and reflections of one star on the other.

Planetary system
Kepler-35b is a gas giant that orbits the two stars in the Kepler-35 system. The planet is over an eighth of Jupiter's mass and has a radius of 0.728 Jupiter radii. The planet completes a somewhat eccentric orbit every 131.458 days from a semimajor axis of just over 0.6 AU, only about 3.5 times the semi-major axis between the parent stars. The proximity and eccentricity of the binary star as well as both stars have similar masses results the planet's orbit to significantly deviate from Keplerian orbit. Studies have suggested that this planet must have been formed outside its current orbit and migrated inwards later. The eccentricity of planetary orbit is acquired on the last stage of migration, due to interaction with the residual debris disk.

Numerical simulation of formation of planetary system Kepler-35 has shown the formation of additional rocky planets in the habitable zone is highly likely, and these planetary orbits are stable.

See also
Kepler-16
Kepler-34
Kepler-38

References

Further reading

Cygnus (constellation)
Eclipsing binaries
Planetary transit variables
2937
G-type main-sequence stars
Circumbinary planets
Planetary systems with one confirmed planet
J19375927+4641231